The Provincial Museum of Ciudad Real is a paleontology and archaeology museum in Ciudad Real, Spain. It is jointly operated with the fine arts museum housed in the Convent of La Merced.

History 
The project was awarded to the architect Carlos Luca de Tena, while building works took place from 1976 to 1978. It was opened to public on 15 March 1982. After reform works between 1993 and 1995, the museum was reopened on 29 March 1995. The museum was thus reopened again on 27 September 2013.

Collection 
The archaeological section exhibits an important set of paleolithic items, chiefly coming from private collections. The Chalcolithic and Bronze Age feature bell beaker pottery and stone arrowheads. The items from the later period also include Bronze Age warrior stelae discovered in the province of Ciudad Real, as recently as that found in Chillón in 2018.

A reconstruction of an Anancus skeleton found in Las Higueruelas constitutes the landmark item of the museum.

References 
Citations

Bibliography
 

Ciudad Real
Archaeological museums in Spain
Museums in Castilla–La Mancha